The Orangery, more specifically the New Orangery is a modern greenhouse in the Royal Garden of Prague Castle, Czechia. It was built between 1999 and 2001 on the site of the former renaissance orangery. It is located next to the Ball Game Hall, on the edge of the Deer Moat. It was designed by Czech architect Eva Jiřičná in high-tech architecture style for Olga Havlová, wife of former Czech president Václav Havel. It is used for growing tropical flowers and plants which are used in Prague Castle. The construction is 100 meters long.

References 

Buildings and structures completed in 2001
High-tech architecture
Prague Castle
Orangeries
Greenhouses in the Czech Republic